Lester Kenneth Walters Jr. (born February 13, 1937) is a former American football player.  

Walters was born in Palmyra, Pennsylvania, in 1937 and attended Milton S. Hershey High School. 

He attended Pennsylvania State University where he played college football at the end position for the Penn State Nittany Lions football team from 1955 to 1957. As a senior in 1957, he caught 24 passes for 426 yards and five touchdowns. He was selected by the Associated Press (AP) as a second-team player on its 1957 College Football All-America Team. He was also selected by both the AP and the United Press as a first-team player on the 1957 All-Eastern college football team. Walters also competed for the Penn State wrestling team.

Walters was selected by the Baltimore Colts in the fourth round (48th overall pick) of the 1958 NFL Draft. He signed with the Colts in February 1958, but he was the last player cut by the Colts before the start of the 1958 season, but was then picked up by the Washington Redskins. He appeared in eight games as a defensive back for the Redskins during the 1958 NFL season. He recorded one interception which he returned for 19 yards.

References

1937 births
Living people
People from Lebanon County, Pennsylvania
Players of American football from Pennsylvania
American football ends
American football defensive backs
Penn State Nittany Lions football players
Washington Redskins players